Galaxy Unpacked is a half annual event held by Samsung Electronics where it showcases new devices including smartphones, tablets, and wearables. It was first held in June 2009 at the CommunicAsia event at the Singapore Expo in Singapore, and is now most frequently held in Barcelona and New York City.

The event includes keynote presentations for product launches, delivered by company management figures. Attendees can visit exhibits and have hands-on experiences of the products in demonstration zones. Live broadcasts of Samsung Unpacked feature a piece of pre-roll music from the Samsung Galaxy franchise, often a customized version of "Over the Horizon", and a repeated animation.

In August 2020, due to the COVID-19 pandemic, Samsung held the first event virtually to launch of its Galaxy Note20 series of devices. It was broadcast live from their headquarters in Suwon, South Korea, and drew 56 million accumulated views.

The Galaxy Unpacked for February 2023 was held on 1 February at 6PM GMT (7PM CET) and was the first in-person since the 2020 event.

Product launches

See Also 
 Samsung Developer Conference (SDC)

References 

Samsung Galaxy
2009 establishments
Technology conferences